Zawiyat Ibn Arraq is located in downtown Beirut, Lebanon.

Overview
Beirut’s only remaining Mamluk building, built in 1517 by the religious authority Mohammad Ibn Arraq Al-Dimashqi. Initially a hospice, it remained a private madrasa (college of jurisprudence) and a zawiya until late Ottoman times.

Construction
A small domed building is all that remains today of the late Mamluk zawiya (prayer corner) of Ibn ‘Arraq Al-Dimashqi. In 1517, Ibn ‘Arraq  built a house and a ribat (hospice) in Beirut. It is recorded that he chose this location to be near the former house of Imam ‘Abd al-Rahman al-Ouzai’i (8th century). The arches of the standing building once opened to other rooms and courtyards.

History
A small domed building is all that remains today of the late Mamluk zawiya (prayer corner) of Ibn ‘Arraq Al-Dimashqi.  Born in Damascus, Ibn ‘Arraq was a religious authority. In 1517, he built a house and a ribat (hospice) in Beirut. It is recorded that he chose this location to be near the former house of Imam ‘Abd Al-Rahman al-Ouzai’i (8th century), whose reputation for holiness and justice spread throughout the Muslim world.  Ibn ‘Arraq died in Mecca in 1526. His house remained a private madrasa (college of jurisprudence) and a zawiya for his followers. The arches of the standing building once opened to other rooms and courtyards. To safeguard its conservation, a steel brace protected the structure during construction.

Timeline
1517: Ibn " Arraq Al-Dimashqi" built a house and a ribat in Beirut.

1526:  Ibn ‘Arraq died in Mecca.

See also
 Mamluk
 Zawiya (institution)

References 
Hallaq, Hassan (1987) Al-tarikh alijtima'i wa al-siyasi wa al-iqtisadi fi Bayrut, [Social, Political and Economic History of Beirut], Dar al-Jami'at, Beirut.
Hallaq, Hassan (1987) Bayrut al-mahrousa fil'ahd al-'uthmâni, [Beirut during the Ottoman Period], Dar al-Jami’at, Beirut.
Seeden, Helga et al. (1995) Urban archaeology 1994: Excavations of the Souks Area, Beirut, Solidere, Beirut.

Buildings and structures in Beirut
Monuments and memorials in Lebanon
Tourist attractions in Beirut